The Alcoholics is a 1953 novel by Jim Thompson.

The novel was re-released in the 1980s along with several other Thompson books under the Black Lizard imprint, by the Creative Arts Book Company.

Plot
The story revolves around Dr. Peter S. Murphy and his clinic El Healtho where he treats alcoholics.

References

1953 American novels
Novels by Jim Thompson
Drug rehabilitation
Novels about alcoholism
English-language novels